Baron Strathcona and Mount Royal, of Mount Royal in the Province of Quebec and Dominion of Canada, and of Glencoe in the County of Argyll, is a title in the Peerage of the United Kingdom. It was created in 1900 for the Scottish-born Canadian financier and politician Donald Smith, 1st Baron Strathcona and Mount Royal, with remainder in default of legitimate male issue to his only daughter, Margaret Charlotte. Smith had already been created Baron Strathcona and Mount Royal, of Glencoe in the County of Argyll, and of Mount Royal in the Province of Quebec and Dominion of Canada, in 1897, with remainder to the legitimate male issue of his body. This title was also in the Peerage of the United Kingdom.

Upon his death in 1914, the barony of 1897 became extinct, while he was succeeded according to the special remainder in the barony of 1900 by his daughter, who became the second Baroness. She was the wife of Robert Jared Bliss Howard, a surgeon. Their eldest son, the third Baron, represented North Cumberland in the British House of Commons as a Unionist from 1922 to 1926. He also served in the National Government as Captain of the Yeomen of the Guard from 1931 to 1934 and as Under-Secretary of State for War from 1934 to 1939. The latter's son, the fourth Baron, succeeded in 1959 and served under Margaret Thatcher as a Minister of State at the Ministry of Defence from 1979 to 1981. His son, the fifth Baron, succeeded in 2018.

Through his estate, the first Baron bequeathed nearly $2 million to educational institutions, including $500,000 to Yale University. Accordingly, Sheffield-Sterling-Strathcona Hall, a classroom and administration building on Yale's campus, is partially named in his honour.

The family seat is Colonsay House on the Isle of Colonsay, in the Scottish Inner Hebrides.

Barons Strathcona and Mount Royal, First creation (1897)

Donald Alexander Smith, 1st Baron Strathcona and Mount Royal (1820–1914)

Barons Strathcona and Mount Royal, Second creation (1900)
Donald Alexander Smith, 1st Baron Strathcona and Mount Royal (1820–1914)
Margaret Charlotte Howard, 2nd Baroness Strathcona and Mount Royal (1854–1926)
Donald Sterling Palmer Howard, 3rd Baron Strathcona and Mount Royal (1891–1959)
(Donald) Euan Palmer Howard, 4th Baron Strathcona and Mount Royal (1923–2018)
(Donald) Alexander Euan Howard, 5th Baron Strathcona and Mount Royal (b. 1961)

The heir apparent is the present holder's son, the Hon. (Donald) Angus Ruaridh Howard (b. 1994).

Line of succession

  Donald Alexander Smith, 1st Baron Strathcona and Mount Royal (1820–1914)
  Margaret Charlotte Howard, 2nd Baroness Strathcona and Mount Royal (1854–1926)
  Donald Sterling Palmer Howard, 3rd Baron Strathcona and Mount Royal (1891–1959)
  (Donald) Euan Palmer Howard, 4th Baron Strathcona and Mount Royal (1923–2018)
  (Donald) Alexander Euan Howard, 5th Baron Strathcona and Mount Royal (b. 1961)
 (1) Hon. Donald Angus Ruaridh Howard (b. 1994)
 (2) Hon. Andrew Barnaby Howard (b. 1963)
 (3) Kier Hamish Shackleton Howard (b. 2000)
 (4) Hon. Jonathan Alan Howard (b. 1933)
 (5) Olaf Philipson Howard (b. 1970)
 Hon. Sir Arthur Jared Palmer Howard (1896 – 1971)
 Alexander Howard (1930 – 2014)
 (6) Shamus Alexander Howard (b. 1962)
 (7) Harry Alexander Howard (b. 1967)
 (8) Rory Jared Howard (b. 1973)

See also
Canadian peers and baronets

References

External links
Lord Strathcona in 1871 - McCord Museum
Lord Strathcona in 1895 - McCord Museum
Lord Strathcona in 1908 - McCord Museum

Baronies in the Peerage of the United Kingdom
Noble titles created in 1900
Noble titles created for UK MPs
Peerages created with special remainders
Extinct baronies in the Peerage of the United Kingdom
Noble titles created in 1897